Philip S. Aiken (born 9 January 1949, in Sydney) is an Australian business executive.

Aiken holds a Bachelor of Engineering degree in chemical engineering from University of Sydney, and has attended the Advanced Management Program from Harvard Business School. Aiken was formerly Group President of BHP Billiton's energy business, and an executive director of BTR plc. He held senior positions in BOC Group, and was also a senior advisor to Macquarie Capital (Europe). He also served as the chairman of Robert Walters from 2007 to 2012.

Early life and education
Aiken was born in Sydney, Australia, on 9 January 1949. In 1970, he graduated with a Bachelor of Engineering degree in chemical engineering from University of Sydney and later in 1989, attended the Advanced Management Program at Harvard Business School.

Career
Aiken started his career in 1970 with BOC Gases; where he served for nearly 26 years, holding several senior positions. In 1995, he was appointed executive director and Chief Executive of BTR Nylex (which later became Invensys). From 1997 until his retirement in 2006, he worked for BHP Billiton; firstly as President of BHP Petroleum, and latterly as Group President of BHP Billiton's Energy business. From 2006 until 2009, he was a senior advisor at Macquarie Bank.

He was appointed to the board of Robert Walters in July 2000, and as its chairman in May 2007. On 24 May 2012, Aiken decided to step down from his role as chairman of Robert Walters once the process of appointing a successor chairman has been completed.

In April 2012, Aiken was appointed to the board of Aveva, to succeed the outgoing chairman Nick Prest. He commenced his duties as chairman after the shareholders approval in the AGM on 12 July 2012. In April 2013 he joined the board of Newcrest Mining. In March 2015, he became chairman of Balfour Beatty (he will step down as chairman on 20 July 2021).

He was also formerly a non-executive director of National Grid plc, copper mining company Kazakhmys, and Indian-focused energy company Essar Energy.

Personal life
Aiken lives in London with his wife, Fran and has a residence in Melbourne. He was awarded a Member of the Order of Australia in June 2013.

References

External links
AVEVA Group plc Board
 National Grid plc Board
Essar Energy plc Board

|-

1949 births
Living people
Businesspeople from Sydney
Australian expatriates in the United Kingdom
20th-century Australian businesspeople
21st-century Australian businesspeople
BHP people
University of Sydney alumni
Members of the Order of Australia
Australian expatriates in the United States